San Marino competed at the 2000 Summer Olympics in Sydney, Australia.

Athletics

Men
Track and road events

Swimming

Men

Shooting

Men

Women

References
Official Olympic Reports

Nations at the 2000 Summer Olympics
2000 Summer Olympics
Summer Olympics